No Mercy is the debut studio album by Puerto Rican singer Daddy Yankee and was released in April 1995 by independent labels White Lion Records and BM Records. Daddy Yankee made the album alongside reggaeton pioneer DJ Playero. This album had rhythms of hip hop, reggae and dancehall. During this time, Daddy Yankee was known as "Winchesta 30-30" or "Winchesta Yankee". After his completion of No Mercy, he began to sell his cassettes in various stores and clubs, and performing for free in high school dances and private parties. After his mild success of No Mercy, many producers and artists began to work with him, taking then the name "Daddy Yankee".

Track listing

The bonus track was a CD exclusive until the album was made available on digital.

References 

1995 debut albums
Daddy Yankee albums